My Weakness Is Strong is the third comedy album by Patton Oswalt, following the 2007 release Werewolves and Lollipops.

Track listing

Disc 1
 Text
 Birth
 Fat
 Treadmill
 Whiskey and Weed and L.S.D.
 The Sad Boy
 The Oswalt Family Crest  
 Rats
 Orgy
 Lofty Thoughts  
 First
 Obama... and Time Travel... and Coolness... and the Last Racist
 Demons
 Sky Cake
 Grocery Robots
 Airplane
 The Magician

Disc 2 (DVD)
 Hello, Optimists 
 Text
 Birth
 Fat
 Treadmill
 Whiskey and Weed and L.S.D.
 The Sad Boy
 The Oswalt Family Crest
 Rats
 Orgy
 Lofty Thoughts
 First
 Obama... and Time Travel... and Coolness... and the Last Racist
 Demons
 Sky Cake
 Grocery Robots
 Airplane
 The Magician

References

2009 albums
Patton Oswalt albums
Warner Records live albums
Live comedy albums
Spoken word albums by American artists
Live spoken word albums
Stand-up comedy albums